Mance or mances or variant, may also refer to:

People
 Mance (surname)
 Baron Mance, an aristocratic title of Britain
 Mance Lipscomb (1895–1976), U.S. blues singer
 Mance Post (1925–2013), Dutch artist
 Mance Smith, U.S. baseball player
 Mance Warner, U.S. pro-wrestler

Fictional characters
 Mance Rayder, a fictional character from G.R.R.Martin's A Song of Ice and Fire and Game of Thrones

Places
 Mance, Meurthe-et-Moselle,  a village in France
 Manče, Vipava, Littoral, Slovenia; a village

Other uses
 Mances, a variety of French red wine grape also known as Fer

See also

 
 Mancey
 Mancy (disambiguation)